Jayantilal Parshottam Bhanusali (1 June 1964 – 8 January 2019)  was a Member of the Legislative Assembly from the Abadasa constituency in Gujarat from December 2007 to December 2012. He was a member of the 12th legislative assembly. He was Gujarat BJP Vice President.

He was shot dead by unidentified attackers aboard a train, Sayajinagari Express between Kataria and Surajbari stations on 8 January 2019. A few days after his murder, fellow BJP member Chhabil Patel was charged by the police for conspiracy.

References

1964 births
2019 deaths
Gujarat MLAs 2007–2012
Bharatiya Janata Party politicians from Gujarat
People from Kutch district
Deaths by firearm in India
Assassinated Indian politicians
Politicians from Kutch district